Events in the year 1910 in Brazil.

Incumbents

Federal government
President: Nilo Peçanha (until 14 November); Marshal Hermes da Fonseca (from 15 November) 
Vice President: vacant (until 14 November); Venceslau Brás (from 15 November)

Governors 
 Alagoas: Euclid Vieira Malta
 Amazonas: Antônio Clemente Ribeiro Bittencourt
 Bahia: João Ferreira de Araújo Pinho
 Ceará: Antônio Nogueira Accioli
 Goiás: Urbano Coelho de Gouveia
 Maranhão:
 till 5 February: Américo Vespúcio dos Reis
 5 February - 1 March: Frederico de Sá Filgueiras
 from 1 March: Luís Antônio Domingues da Silva
 Mato Grosso: Pedro Celestino Corrêa da Costa
 Minas Gerais: 
 till 7 September: Venceslau Brás
 from 7 September: Júlio Bueno Brandão
 Pará: João Antônio Luís Coelho
 Paraíba: João Lopes Machado
 Paraná: Francisco Xavier da Silva
 Pernambuco: Herculano Bandeira de Melo
 Piauí:
 till 15 March: Manuel Raimundo da Paz
 from 15 March: Antonino Freire da Silva
 Rio Grande do Norte: Alberto Maranhão 
 Rio Grande do Sul: Carlos Barbosa Gonçalves
 Santa Catarina:
 São Paulo: 
 Sergipe:

Vice governors 
 Rio Grande do Norte:
 São Paulo:

Events
1 March - In the presidential election, Hermes da Fonseca receives 57.1% of the vote. Fonseca is supported by several of the most influential Republican parties, while his main opponent, Rui Barbosa, is supported by the Civilist Campaign. 
7 May - João do Rio is elected to chair # 26 of the Brazilian Academy of Letters.
October - The Conservative Republican Party is founded, in support of new president Hermes da Fonseca.
22 November - Revolt of the Lash: The mostly black crews of four Brazilian warships, led by João Cândido Felisberto, mutiny shortly after a sailor receives 250 lashes. The crews depose their white officers and threaten to bombard Rio de Janeiro.

Births

18 February - Lycia de Biase Bidart, musician (died 1990)
4 March - Tancredo de Almeida Neves, politician (died 1985)
19 June - Pagu, political, literary and artistic activist (died 1962)
17 November - Rachel de Queiroz, journalist and novelist (died 2003)
11 December - Noel Rosa, singer and songwriter (died 1937)
15 December - Rodolfo Arena, actor (died 1980)

Deaths
17 January - Joaquim Nabuco, abolitionist statesman and writer (born 1849)

See also 
1910 in Brazilian football

References

 
1910s in Brazil
Years of the 20th century in Brazil
Brazil
Brazil